Gibberula peterbonuttii is a species of sea snail, a marine gastropod mollusk, in the family Cystiscidae. This species is found in Oman.

References

peterbonuttii
Gastropods described in 2018